The 2018–19 UT Arlington Mavericks women's basketball team represents the University of Texas at Arlington in the 2018–19 NCAA Division I women's basketball season. The Mavericks, led by sixth year head coach Krista Gerlich, play their home games at the College Park Center and were members of the Sun Belt Conference. They finished the season 24–8, 15–3 in Sun Belt play to share the Sun Belt regular season title with Little Rock. They lost in the semifinals of the Sun Belt women's tournament to South Alabama. They received an automatic bid to the WNIT where they defeated Stephen F. Austin in the first round before losing to TCU in the second round.

Roster

Schedule

|-
!colspan=9 style=| Non-conference regular season

|-
!colspan=9 style=| Sun Belt regular season

|-
!colspan=9 style=| Sun Belt Women's Tournament

|-
!colspan=9 style=| WNIT

Rankings
2018–19 NCAA Division I women's basketball rankings

See also
 2018–19 UT Arlington Mavericks men's basketball team

References

UT Arlington
UT Arlington Mavericks women's basketball seasons
UT Arlington